ShoMMA: Strikeforce Challengers is a mixed martial arts series that was produced by the mixed martial arts organization Strikeforce and the Showtime cable network.  Similar to Showtime's earlier ShoXC, the purpose of the series was to highlight up and coming MMA fighters.

Strikeforce Challengers was discontinued with the 2012 Strikeforce deal.

Events

Notes
All Strikeforce women's fights are five-minute rounds (except in one-night tournaments).

References

External links
 

Strikeforce (mixed martial arts)
Mixed martial arts television shows
2009 American television series debuts
2012 American television series endings
Showtime (TV network) original programming